German submarine U-192 was a very short-lived Type IXC/40 U-boat of Nazi Germany's Kriegsmarine built during World War II for service in the Battle of the Atlantic. During her maiden voyage in May 1943, she was sunk by a British warship, HMS Loosestrife on 6 May 1943.

Design
German Type IXC/40 submarines were slightly larger than the original Type IXCs. U-192 had a displacement of  when at the surface and  while submerged. She had two shafts and two  propellers.

U-192 was fitted with six  torpedo tubes (four fitted at the bow and two at the stern), 22 torpedoes, one  SK C/32 naval gun, 180 rounds, and a  SK C/30 as well as a  C/30 anti-aircraft gun. The boat had a complement of forty-eight.

Service history

She was built in Bremen during 1942 and was ready to sail in April 1943, following four months of training and working-up trials in the Baltic Sea, under the command of Oberleutnant zur See Werner Happe (Crew 36).

U-192 left Kiel for operations in the West Atlantic on 13 April 1943. The U-boat participated in three wolfpacks, Meise, Star, and Fink at the end of April 1943. Two attacks on Allied shipping had failed, when U-192 was picked up by an escort of convoy ONS 5, HMS Loosestrife, early on 6 May 1943. The escort sank the U-boat with depth charges, killing its entire crew of 55.

Wolfpacks
U-192 took part in three wolfpacks, namely:
 Meise (25 – 27 April 1943)
 Star (27 April - 4 May 1943)
 Fink (4 – 6 May 1943)

References

Bibliography

External links

German Type IX submarines
U-boats sunk by depth charges
U-boats commissioned in 1942
1942 ships
U-boats sunk in 1943
U-boats sunk by British warships
World War II submarines of Germany
World War II shipwrecks in the Atlantic Ocean
Ships built in Bremen (state)
Ships lost with all hands
Maritime incidents in May 1943